Bob McKenty is a poet noted for his mastery of light verse.

McKenty, a graduate of the University of Notre Dame, began writing poems to kill time during the long daily commute from his home in Matawan, New Jersey to work at the Equitable Insurance Company in Manhattan.  His poetry—always formal and humorous—has appeared in The New York Times, Light Quarterly, The Formalist, Reader's Digest, The Wall Street Journal, Playboy, and McCall's, as well as anthologies by Random House and others.  X. J. Kennedy has lauded him as "one of the most skillful writers of light verse in America", and in 1999 he won the Howard Nemerov Sonnet Award, the only time that award has been given for a work of light verse.

McKenty was an active member of the Bards' Buffet, a group of light poets (including Alma Denny, Willard R. Espy, Louis Phillips, and Maureen Cannon) who occasionally dined together in New York City.

Bibliography 
 Bob McKenty. Fallout from the Nuclear Family. Northwind, 1995. .
 Bob McKenty. Fair Game: Open Season on Baseball.  Doggerel Daze, 2005. .

References 

American humorists
Living people
Poets from New Jersey
20th-century American poets
21st-century American poets
20th-century births
People from Matawan, New Jersey
University of Notre Dame alumni
Year of birth missing (living people)